Mahan is both a surname and a given name. 

When used as given name in Persian (ماهان māhān), it means "like the moon" or "moon-like", or even referring to something "as beautiful as the moon".

Notable people with the name include:

Surname
 Alfred Thayer Mahan (1840–1914), American officer, geostrategist, and naval historian
 Armand Mahan (born 1983), Ivorian football player
 Art Mahan (1913–2010), American baseball player
 Asa Mahan (1800–1889), first president of Oberlin College
 Dennis Hart Mahan (1802–1871), professor at the US Military Academy, father of Alfred 
 Eddie Mahan (1892–1975), American football player
 Hunter Mahan (born 1981), American golfer
 Larry Mahan (born 1943), eight time rodeo world champion
 Sean Mahan (born 1980), American football player
 William Dennes Mahan (1824–1906), Presbyterian minister and author of The Archko Volume

Given name
 Mahan Mitra, Indian mathematician
 Mahan Esfahani, Iranian-American harpsichordist